Des Moines Township is one of seventeen townships in Boone County, Iowa, USA.  As of the 2000 census, its population was 13,758.

Geography
According to the USGS, it contains seven cemeteries: Bass Point, Biblical College, Boone Memorial Garden, Leatham, Linwood Park, Oak Grove and Sacred Heart.

References

External links
 US-Counties.com
 City-Data.com

Townships in Boone County, Iowa
Townships in Iowa